Damien Wayne Echols (born Michael Wayne Hutchison; December 11, 1974) is an American writer, best known as one of the West Memphis Three, a group of teenagers convicted of a triple murder. Upon his release from death row in 2011 under an Alford plea, Echols authored several autobiographies and spiritual books. He has been featured in multiple books, documentaries, and podcasts about his spiritual works and the West Memphis Three case.

Biography

Early life 
Damien Wayne Echols was born on December 11, 1974. He lived with his mother and father until their divorce, when he was 8. The family frequently moved and Echols would attend eight schools before the age of ten.

At the age of 13, he changed his birth name from Michael Wayne Hutchinson, taking a new name and the last name of his stepfather Jack Echols.

The family settled in Echols's home in West Memphis, Arkansas, where Echols attended school. He was still in the ninth grade at the age of 17.

Echols, with his habits of dressing in black and listening to heavy metal music, was a misfit within the local community. He also wrote dark and expressive poems.

The Robin Hood Hills murders 

In 1993, when Echols was 18, he was arrested along with Jason Baldwin (16) and Jessie Misskelley (17) for the murder of three eight-year-olds: Steve Branch, Michael Moore and Christopher Byers. They were convicted.

On death row 
On March 19, 1994, Judge David Burnett sentenced Echols to death by lethal injection. On December 23, 1996, the Arkansas Supreme Court denied appeals from Echols and Baldwin. In May 1998, Echols won a hearing on charges that his defense counsel had been incompetent, but Judge Burnett ruled against him in June 1999.

In 2007, new DNA testing became available that was not technologically possible at the time of the crime, and produced evidence that hairs found at the crime scene did not match Misskelley, Baldwin or Echols and possibly matched the stepfather of one of the victims.
Based on this, the defendants asked Burnett for a new trial. In September 2008, Burnett denied retrials for all three saying the new evidence was "inconclusive".

Echols spent his time on death row at the Varner Unit Supermax.
In his first years, he studied Buddhism and was doing meditation five to seven hours a day. Later, he became interested in ceremonial magick. He spent most of the 18 years in prison studying magick.

In 2005, he self-published his autobiography Almost Home with a foreword written by Margaret Cho.

Marriage 
In 1996, Echols met his future wife Lorri Davis, a landscape architect who learned about the case after seeing Paradise Lost, in New York, and she wrote him a letter. They began a romantic relationship, and in 1997 Davis quit her job, moved to Little Rock, Arkansas, and began working on Echols's case.

In December 1999, they married in a Buddhist ceremony, held in the prison visiting room.

Release from prison 
In November 2010, after Judge Burnett had retired from the bench, the Arkansas Supreme Court ordered new evidentiary hearings for all three defendants based on the new DNA evidence. The state's high court rebuked Burnett's 2008 decision not to grant Echols a new trial based on the DNA evidence.

In 2010, after DNA evidence raised the possibility that they had not committed the crime, they were granted an evidentiary hearing. In August 2011, Echols's lawyers, Steve Braga and Patrick Benca negotiated an Alford plea, which allows the defendant to maintain their innocence while conceding that there is enough evidence to possibly convict them at trial. Under the plea deals, all three were resentenced to time-served for the murders (18 years and 75 days) and immediately released from prison.

Life after release 
After the release from prison, Echols and his wife moved to New York City and lived in Peter Jackson's apartment. They next moved to Salem, Massachusetts, and finally settled in Harlem, New York City. In 2012, Echols published the book Life After Death, which became a New York Times Best Seller.

Also in 2012, West of Memphis, a documentary film directed and co-written by Amy J. Berg, and produced by Peter Jackson and Echols, was released in the US by Sony Pictures Classics. It has been reported that Jackson and Fran Walsh started to work on this project in 2005 and conducted their own private investigation. The film received a nomination for Best Documentary Screenplay from the Writers Guild of America.

In 2014, Echols and Lorri Davis co-authored a book Yours for Eternity, which consists of their letters while Echols was in prison.

Echols has had a number of art exhibitions, showing pieces of art that he created in prison. He has also held a number of events devoted to ceremonial magick.

In 2018, he published High Magick: A Guide to the Spiritual Practices That Saved My Life on Death Row, a book that described his spiritual experience in prison. It was followed by Angels and Archangels: A Magician's Guide, published in 2020.

In popular culture

Paradise Lost documentary series 

Considering strong national interest in the case and the age of the suspected perpetrators, HBO commissioned Joe Berlinger and Bruce Sinofsky to film the trial and produce a documentary. In an unprecedented move, the judge allowed full access to the hearings, the victim's families and the accused. The resulting three film series became the most famous work of Bruce Sinofsky and won him Emmy Award and Peabody Award in 1996 and an Oscar Award nomination for 2011's Paradise Lost 3: Purgatory. The first film, Paradise Lost: The Child Murders at Robin Hood Hills, came out in 1996. It was the beginning of a world-wide campaign to free the young men who became known as The West Memphis Three.

Celebrity support and collaborations 
A number of Hollywood celebrities, notably Pearl Jam lead vocalist Eddie Vedder and actor Johnny Depp, publicly advocated for the release of The Memphis Three. Vedder sat next to Echols's wife Lorri in the front row of the courtroom and embraced Echols once he was released. Echols co-wrote the lyrics to the song "Army Reserve" from the 2006  Pearl Jam album. Former Misfits vocalist Michale Graves also supported the case, and in October 2007 he recorded his Illusions album, featuring written content and backing vocals from Echols.

The Devil's Knot book and film 
Echols's character is central for the Devil's Knot: The True Story of the West Memphis Three, a 2002 true crime story by Mara Leveritt. In 2013, Atom Egoyan directed Devil's Knot, a film adaptation of the book with Reese Witherspoon and Colin Firth. Echols's character was played by an upcoming actor James Hamrick.

The Midnight Gospel appearance 
In April 2020, Echols appeared as Darryl the Fish in The Midnight Gospel animated TV series aired on Netflix. His character walked the main character Clancy through the philosophy of magick.

Stranger Things character 
In the fourth season of Netflix's Stranger Things the character and story of Eddie Munson is closely based on Echols' life as he too is wrongly accused of murder based on his appearance. The writers reportedly took inspiration from the Paradise Lost documentary.

Books

References

Bibliography

External links 
 
 Damien Echols profile on WorldCat
 

People from Marion, Arkansas
1974 births
West Memphis Three
American people convicted of murder
American prisoners sentenced to death
People convicted of murder by Arkansas
People who entered an Alford plea
Prisoners sentenced to death by Arkansas
21st-century American writers
American film producers
Living people
Ceremonial magicians